Brick nog, (nogging or nogged, beam filling) is a construction technique in which bricks are used to fill the vacancies in a wooden frame. The walls then may be covered with tile, weatherboards or rendered. Generally the term "brick infill" is used instead of nogging in half-timbered construction.

References 

Bricks